Ernest Peak -  Lyell 3, L3 or Mt. Lyell (on maps, etc.) - is the central and highest peak of five distinct subpeaks on Mount Lyell (Canada) and is located on the border of Alberta and British Columbia. (There has been some dispute whether Lyell 2 or Lyell 3 is highest, but according to the recently released and corrected Climbers Guide to The Canadian Rocky Mountains - Rockies West book, the tallest is Ernest Peak). It was named in 1972 by Sydney R. Vallance after Ernest Feuz Jr.


Geology and climate
Due to this peak being the central and tallest subpeak - and thus is "Mount Lyell" - see the Mount Lyell article for geology and climate.

See also
List of peaks on the British Columbia–Alberta border

References

External links
 Ernest Peak climbing photo: Flickr

Mountains of Banff National Park
Three-thousanders of Alberta
Three-thousanders of British Columbia
Canadian Rockies